Polzela is a settlement in Slovenia. It is the seat of the Municipality of Polzela. It lies on the left bank of the Savinja River extending into the Ložnica Hills to the north. The area is part of the traditional region of Styria. It is now included in the Savinja Statistical Region.

Buildings

On a hill in the centre of the settlement is Komenda Castle, a 13th-century castle used in later centuries by the Knights Hospitaller and greatly rebuilt in the 19th century. A marble lion found at the castle and the Hospitallers' Maltese cross appear in the municipal coat of arms. A Late Baroque mansion dating to the late 18th century known as Šenek Mansion with a chapel dedicated to Saint Florian and its surrounding park to the northeast of the settlement is one of the municipality's major landmarks. The parish church in the settlement is dedicated to Saint Margaret and belongs to the Roman Catholic Diocese of Celje. It was first mentioned in written documents dating to the 13th century and the core of its nave is still the original Romanesque building with 18th-century extensions and a 15th-century belfry.

References

External links

 Polzela on Geopedia

Populated places in the Municipality of Polzela